David Charles Stark is Arthur Lehman Professor of Sociology at Columbia University, where he served as chair of the sociology department and currently directs the Center on Organizational Innovation. He is also Professor of Social Science at the University of Warwick. He was formerly an External Faculty Member of the Santa Fe Institute. He is well-cited in the fields of economic sociology, social networks, science and technology studies, and social change and development.

Biography

He received a B.A. (summa cum laude) from Princeton in 1972 and a Ph.D. in sociology from Harvard in 1982.  Stark was the recipient of a Guggenheim Fellowship in 2002.  He is the former president of the Society for the Advancement of Socio-Economics, and has been a visiting fellow at numerous institutions, including at the Berlin Institute for Advanced Study, Sciences Po in Paris, the Institute for Advanced Study at Zhejiang University in China, Copenhagen Business School, the Netherlands Institute for Advanced Study, the Russell Sage Foundation in New York City, the Center for Advanced Study in the Behavioral Sciences in Palo Alto, the Institute for Advanced Study/Collegium Budapest, the Ecole des Hautes Etudes en Sciences Sociales in Paris, the Social Science Research Center Berlin (WZB), and the Institute for Human Sciences in Vienna.  Stark won the  2009 W. Richard Scott Award for Distinguished Scholarship from the American Sociological Association for his paper, “Social Times of Network Spaces” (with Balazs Vedres), which appeared in American Journal of Sociology (2006). In 2013 he received a Doctor Honoris Causa (Honorary Doctorate) from the École normale supérieure de Cachan.

Work

He has been a leading contributor in developing the concept of heterarchy, referring to the process of distributed intelligence and diversity of evaluative principles in organizations.  He coined the term "recombinant property" to analyze asset ambiguity during the transformation of the economies of the former Soviet bloc.  It has been adopted to study processes of innovation in high technology sectors of the United States and Western Europe.

Stark has been a leading contributor to the new economic sociology. His research uses ethnographic fieldwork and social network analysis. In examining organizational forms as sites of multiple evaluative principles, or frames of worth, he has carried out field research in Hungarian factories before and after 1989, in new media startups in Manhattan before and after the dot.com crash of hi-tech firm stocks in 2000, and in a World Financial Center trading room before and after the attacks on September 11, 2001.  His work with Balazs Vedres developed a combination of network and sequence analytic methods, a key development in the emerging field of social sequence analysis.

In his book, The Sense of Dissonance: Accounts of Worth in Economic Life, published in 2009, Stark draws on much of his recent research in post-socialist transformations in Hungary, his study of new media firms in Silicon Alley, and his work on decision making in trading rooms.  Stark ties these examples together and suggests a number of key determinants of innovation within organization.  Foremost of these determinants is a wealth of different goals and notions of worth motivating actors in an organization.  With different conceptions of what is valuable, he argues, organizations can be equipped to succeed in a search in which what they are searching for is unclear (how Stark defines innovation).

As of 2016 Stark has been principal investigator on the European Research Council Horizon 2020 project BLINDSPOT: Diversity and Performance in Networks and Teams.

In 2020, Stark co-edited with Noortje Marres a special issue of the British Journal of Sociology on the sociology of testing. In the same year, Stark also edited the Oxford University Press book The Performance Complex: Competition and Competitions in Social Life .

In 2021, Stark co-edited with Ivana Pais a special issue of Sociologica titled 'Power and Control in Platform Monopoly Capitalism.'

Selected articles
 "Algorithmic Management in the Platform Economy." Sociologica, 2020, 14(3):47-72 (with Ivana Pais).
 "The Performance Complex". pp. 1-27 in David Stark (Ed.) The Performance Complex. Oxford: Oxford University Press.
 "Testing and Being Tested in Pandemic Times." Sociologica, 2020, (14(1):67-94.
 "Put to the test: For a New Sociology of Testing." British Journal of Sociology, 2020, 71(3):423-443
 "Underground Testing: Personas as Probes in Underground Music." British Journal of Sociology, 2020, 71(3):527-589.
 "What's Observed in a Rating? Rankings as Orientation in the face of Uncertainty." Theory, Culture & Society, 2019, 36(4):3-26 (with Elena Esposito).
 "The Möbius Organizational Form: Make, Buy, Cooperate, or Co-opt?." Sociologica, 2018, 12(1):65-80 (with Elizabeth WatKins).
 "For What It's Worth." Research in the Sociology of Organizations, 2017, 52:383-397.
 "Game Changer: The Topology of Creativity." American Journal of Sociology, January 2015, 120(4):1144-1194 (with Mathijs de Vaan and Balazs Vedres).
 "Ethnic Diversity Deflates Price Bubbles." Proceedings of the National Academy of Sciences, December 2014, 111(52): 185240-18529 (with Sheen S. Levine, Evan P. Apfelbaum, Mark Bernard, Valerie L. Bartelt, and Edward J. Zajac).
 "Political Holes in the Economy: The Business Network of Partisan Firms in Hungary." American Sociological Review, October 2012, 77(5): 700-722 (with Balazs Vedres).
 "Structural Folds: Generative Disruption in Overlapping Groups." American Journal of Sociology, January 2010, 115(4): 1150-1190 (with Balazs Vedres).
 "PowerPoint in Public: Digital Technologies and the New Morphology of Demonstration." Theory, Culture & Society, 2008, 25(5): 31-56 (with Verena Paravel).
 "Social Times of Network Spaces:  Network Sequences and Foreign Investment in Hungary.” (with Balazs Vedres)  American Journal of Sociology, March 2006, 111(5): 1368–1411.
 "Socio-technologies of Assembly: Sense-making and Demonstration in Rebuilding Lower Manhattan.” (with Monique Girard)  In David Lazer and Viktor Mayer-Schönberger, eds.,   Governance and Information:  The Rewiring of Governing and Deliberation in the 21st Century.  New York and Oxford: Oxford University Press, 2007.
 "How to Recognize Opportunities: Heterarchical Search in a Trading Room."  pp. 84–101 in Karin Knorr Cetina and Alexa Preda, eds., The Sociology of Financial Markets. Oxford: Oxford University Press (with Daniel Beunza).
 "Tools of the Trade: The Socio-Technology of Arbitrage in a Wall Street Trading Room.”  (with Daniel Beunza)  Industrial and Corporate Change, vol. 13, no. 1, 2004, pp. 369–401.
 "Permanently Beta: Responsive Organization in the Internet Era."  (with Gina Neff)  In Philip E.N. Howard and Steve Jones, eds., Society Online: The Internet In Context.  Thousand Oaks, CA: Sage, 2003, pp. 173–188. 
 “Distributing Intelligence and Organizing Diversity in New Media Projects.” (with Monique Girard) Environment and Planning A, vol. 34, no 11, November 2002, pp. 1927–1949. ISSN 0308-518X
 “Ambiguous Assets for Uncertain Environments: Heterarchy in Postsocialist Firms,”  In Paul DiMaggio, ed.,  The Twenty-First-Century Firm: Changing Economic Organization in International Perspective. Princeton University Press, 2001, pp. 69–104. 
 "Recombinant Property in East European Capitalism."  American Journal of Sociology. January 1996, vol. 101, no. 4, pp. 993–1027.

Books
 The Performance Complex: Competition and Competitions in Social Life, (Editor). Oxford and New York: Oxford University Press. 
 Moments of Valuation: Exploring Sites of Dissonance, (Co-editor with Ariane Berthoine Antal and Michael Hutter). Oxford and New York: Oxford University Press, 2015.
 This Place, These People: Life and Shadow on the Great Plains, (with Nancy Warner). Columbia University Press, 2014.
 The Sense of Dissonance: Accounts of Worth in Economic Life, Princeton University Press, 2009.
 Postsocialist Pathways: Transforming Politics and Property in East Central Europe (with László Bruszt).  New York and Cambridge: Cambridge University Press, 1998 
 Restructuring Networks in Postsocialism: Legacies, Linkages, and Localities (Co-editor with Gernot Grabher), London and New York: Oxford University Press, 1997. 
 Remaking the Economic Institutions of Socialism: China and Eastern Europe (Co-editor with Victor Nee), Stanford: Stanford University Press, 1989.

References

External links
 Center on Organizational Innovation
The Sense of Dissonance -Personal Webpage

Columbia University faculty
Living people
Stark David C.
Stark David C.
American sociologists
1950 births
Santa Fe Institute people
Network scientists